Dig In! is the second album by Huevos Rancheros. It was released on CD May 27, 1995 on Mint Records in North America. It was released in Europe on One Louder records on CD and lime-green vinyl.

CD Track Listing
All songs written by Brent J. Cooper, Graham Evans, and Ritchie Lazarowich, except where noted.
"Secret Recipe"
"Whiteout In Wyoming"
"Rockin' In The Henhouse"
"American Sunset" (Wray/Wray)
"Where's The Bathroom? (In Spanish)"
"64 Slices Of American Cheeze"
"Gump Worsley's Lament"
"Jezebel" (Shanklin)
"Evacuation" (Johns)
"Girl From N.A.N.A.I.M.O."
"Who's Your New Girlfriend?"
"Rockin' Lafayette" (Falcon)
"Go West Young Bee"

References

1995 albums
Huevos Rancheros (band) albums
Mint Records albums